Jürgen Chrobog (born February 28, 1940) is a German jurist and former diplomat. He worked in the Foreign Office of West Germany and the reunified Germany and among other diplomatic postings, was Ambassador to the United States from 1995 to 2001.

Life and career
Chrobog was born in Berlin. He studied law in the 1960s in Freiburg im Breisgau, Göttingen, and Aix-en-Provence and then worked as an attorney in Hannover. In 1972, he joined the diplomatic service of the Federal Republic of Germany, which he served in the United Nations in New York.

A member of the Freie Demokratische Partei, from 1973 to 1977 he worked in the German Foreign Office under foreign ministers Walter Scheel and Hans-Dietrich Genscher, where he was responsible for European issues as well as the Third World. In 1977, he was dispatched to Singapore, and in 1980, to the European Union headquarters in Brussels.

From 1984 to 1991, Chrobog was the head of the press division as well as the spokesperson for the Foreign Office, and beginning in 1988, directed Genscher's ministerial office. From 1995 to 2001, he was the German ambassador to the United States. After this posting, he returned to Berlin as State Secretary of the German Federal Foreign Office, under foreign minister Joschka Fischer.

Chrobog represented West Germany at the 2+4 negotiations with East Germany and the four victorious powers of World War II (the United States, the Soviet Union, the United Kingdom, and France) concerning the reunification of Germany and its future as a NATO member, and referred to those negotiations in a meeting of the directors of the US, UK, French, and German foreign ministries in Bonn. After the meeting of the political directors of the US, British, French and German foreign ministries in Bonn on March 6, 1991, Chrobog wrote: “We made it clear in the two-plus-four negotiations that we would not take NATO beyond the Elbe stretch. We can therefore not offer Poland and the others NATO membership."

In 2003, as undersecretary of state, Chrobog was responsible for dealing with the crisis provoked by the kidnapping of German tourists in Algeria.

In late December that year, he and his family were abducted while traveling on vacation in eastern Yemen; they were released on December 31.

Personal life
Chrobog and his wife, Magda Gohar-Chrobog, have three sons.

See also
List of kidnappings
List of solved missing person cases

Sources

External links

1940 births
2000s missing person cases
Ambassadors of Germany to the United States
Formerly missing people
German diplomats
German people taken hostage
Living people
Kidnapped German people
Missing person cases in Yemen
Paul Cézanne University alumni
People from Berlin